Epirrita undulata is a species of geometrid moth in the family Geometridae.

The MONA or Hodges number for Epirrita undulata is 7434.

References

Further reading

 
 

Epirrita
Articles created by Qbugbot
Moths described in 1942